James Fielding Sweeny  (1857–1940) was an Anglican bishop. He was the 4th Bishop of Toronto and Archbishop of Ontario.

Biography
He was born in London, England on November 15, 1857, the son of Lt. Col. James Fielding Sweeny, formerly Her Majesty's staff officer of pensioners at Montreal, and his wife, Anna Maria Fielding.

Sweeny was one of ten children, and his brothers included George Robert Sweeny, a barrister of Toronto, Charles Sweeny, a Vice President of the C.P.R., and Roger Sweeny, Commandant of Her Majesty's Indian Army Staff College, and sisters Kathleen Chipman and Georgina, Lady Aylmer, wife of Arthur Lovell Aylmer, Lord Aylmer.

He was educated at the High School of Montreal, at McGill Normal School, and at McGill University (B.A., 1878 ; M.A. 1881), and pursued his theological studies at the Montreal Diocesan Theological College.  He was ordained deacon and priest, by Bishop Bond. He received from the University of Trinity College, Toronto, the degree of M.A. and B.D. in 1883 and that of D.D., in course, 1885.

On his ordination in 1880, he became Rector of St. Luke's, and Chaplain to the Montreal General Hospital.

In 1882 he became Rector of St. Philips, Toronto. In 1883 he married Georgiana Bostwick, daughter of John Bostwick, Seigneur of Lanoraie. In 1889 he was appointed an honorary canon of St. Alban's Cathedral, Toronto, and was elected R. D. of Toronto in 1895. He was a member of the Council of the Toronto Church of England S. S. Association, and V.P. of the Toronto Church School.  He has been also an active promoter of the Church of England Temperance Society.

In 1909 he was elected Bishop of Toronto and Rector of the Cathedral Church of St James succeeding Arthur Sweatman.

In 1923, he laid the cornerstone of Trinity College, on Hoskin Ave, built on a site purchased in 1913, but due to World War I construction was not begun until 1923. The architects were Pearson and Darling.

In 1932 he was elected Metropolitan of the Ecclesiastical Province of Ontario (Archbishop of Ontario)

Sweeny was awarded honorary doctorates from Bishops, Wycliffe, Kings and Windsor, Nova Scotia.

References

Footnotes

Trinity College (Canada) alumni
1857 births
1940 deaths
Anglican bishops of Toronto
20th-century Anglican Church of Canada bishops
High School of Montreal alumni
McGill University alumni